Robert Holyhead (born 1974 in Trowbridge, Wiltshire) is a British abstract artist. He studied painting at Manchester School of Art and completed his MA at Chelsea School of Art in 1997.

Holyhead's work is marked by expanses of white ground left uncovered with traces of colour at the canvas-edge where paint has been carefully removed from the surface. Whilst some pieces are covered almost entirely with semi-translucent paint others are, in contrast, sporadically punctured by intensely coloured, geometric shapes.

In 2005 he was awarded a five-year live/work residency at Acme Fire Station and in 2007 he was invited to spend three months in Switzerland on a residency with Fundaziun NAIRS. In 2009 he had a solo exhibition at Karsten Schubert and was included in The Painting Edition of the East End Academy at the Whitechapel Gallery, London.

He is represented by Galerie Max Hetzler, London, Paris, Berlin.

He is a senior lecturer in Fine Art at Anglia Ruskin University.

Solo Exhibitions
 2019 
'No movement, no colour', Galerie Max Hetzler, London
2017
'New Works', Galería Casado Santapau, Madrid
2016
'Open Ground: Robert Holyhead',Parts Project, The Hague

Galerie Max Hetzler, Paris
2014
Galerie Max Hetzler, Berlin (catalogue)
2012
'New Paintings', Karsten Schubert, London (catalogue)

'Paintings and works on paper', PEER, London (catalogue)

Group Exhibitions
2019
'Teaching Painting: Fully Awake 5.6', Freelands Foundation, London

'Playtime', ARTHOUSE1, London
2017
'Sotto Pelle', Annarumma gallery, Naples

'Shaping the Void II', Tannery Arts, London
2016
Gillmeier Rech, Berlin

2015
'Drawing Biennial', Tannery Arts, London

2014
'Detail', H Gallery, Bangkok 

2013
'Stag - Berlin/London', Dispari & Dispari, Reggio Emilia

'Drawings', Karsten Schubert, London

'Every bird brings a different melody to the garden', No Format, London

'System Painting', Construction Archive Lion and Lamb, London

'Head to Head', Rogue Project Space, Manchester

Commissions

2010	New British Embassy and the UK Permanent Representation to the European Union, Brussels, Belgium (Government Art Collection)

Public collections

2011    Tate Collection

2009	Arts Council Collection of Great Britain, London

Centre Pompidou, Paris

Government Art Collection, London

YUZ Museum, Shanghai

Publications
 Robert Holyhead [2014], with a text by David Ryan. Published by Holzwarth Publications in collaboration with Galerie Max Hetzler and Ridinghouse, London.
 Robert Holyhead [2010], in conversation with Anthony Spira. Published by Ridinghouse, London. 
 Robert Holyhead: New Paintings [2009], with an essay by Anna Lovatt. Published by Ridinghouse, London. 
 Robert Holyhead [2008], exhibition catalogue published by Vaughan Press.

References

External links
 Website
 Galerie Max Hetzler, Artist Page

20th-century British painters
British male painters
21st-century British painters
Living people
1974 births
People from Trowbridge
Alumni of the University of the Arts London
British abstract artists
20th-century British male artists
21st-century British male artists